Ambesager Yosief (born 29 June 1984) is an Eritrean footballer who plays for Adelaide Raiders.

Club career
On 26 August 2011 he signed with A-League club Gold Coast United from FFSA Super League club Western Strikers. On 30 November 2011 he made his debut for Gold Coast United in a match against Newcastle Jets.

International career
Yosief played in the 2009 CECAFA Cup in Kenya, appearing in the 4–0 quarter final defeat to Tanzania.

Personal life
Whilst competing in the 2009 CECAFA Cup in Kenya he was part of the Eritrea national football team which failed to return home after competing in the regional tournament in Nairobi. After receiving refugee status from the Australian government, the team moved to Adelaide, Australia.

References

1984 births
Living people
Sportspeople from Asmara
Eritrean footballers
Eritrean expatriate footballers
Eritrea international footballers
Association football defenders
A-League Men players
FFSA Super League players
Western Strikers SC players
Gold Coast United FC players
Adelaide Olympic FC players
West Torrens Birkalla SC players
Croydon Kings players
Adelaide Raiders SC players
Expatriate soccer players in Australia
Eritrean refugees
National Premier Leagues players